Pauline Margrit Gardiner (born 11 October 1945) is a retired artistic gymnast from New Zealand who competed at the 1964 Olympics.

Career 
She coached at University of California, Berkeley in the 1970s. She owned GyMarin Gymnastics Center and Gymnos in Marin County near San Francisco in the 1980s.  She was a National level coach in Rhythmic Gymnastics, qualifying several competitors for National and Junior National teams in the 1980s.  She was a member of the United States Gymnastic Federation board, representing Rhythmic Gymnastics. She worked on the staff at 1984 Olympic Games. 

She moved to England and continued to coach when her children were accepted to Oxford University in the 1990s. She returned to New Zealand and accepted a position with the New Zealand Gymnastics Federation in the late 1990s and early 2000s. She returned to the US in 2006. She manages and coaches gymnastics. She  operates Sokol Fort Worth gymnastics in Fort Worth, Texas.

Personal life 
She married an American gymnast in the late 1960s. She is the mother of three children. She later married gymnastics coach Rome Milan and lives in Texas. 

Gardiner is a painter with work on display with the Art of the Olympians organization and program.

References 

1945 births
Living people
Gymnasts at the 1964 Summer Olympics
Olympic gymnasts of New Zealand
New Zealand female artistic gymnasts
20th-century New Zealand women